Capricorn (pl. capricorni or capricorns) may refer to:

Places
Capricorn and Bunker Group, islands of the southern Great Barrier Reef, Australia
Capricorn District Municipality, Limpopo province, South Africa

Animals
Capricorn, an animal from the ibex family, particularly the Alpine ibex
Capricornis, a genus of goat-like or antelope-like animals

Astronomy and astrology 
 Capricornus, one of the constellations of the zodiac
 Capricorn (astrology)

Arts, entertainment, and media

Fictional characters
Capricorn (comics), several Marvel Comics characters
Capricorn (Inkworld), Inkheart character

Music

Groups and labels
 Capricorn Records, an American record label active 1969-1979

Albums
Capricorn (Jay Chou album), 2008
Capricorn (Trevor Powers album), 2020
Capricorn (Mike Tramp album), 1997
"Capricorn (A Brand New Name)", a 2002 single by 30 Seconds to Mars from their self-titled album

Songs
"Capricorn", a song by IQ from their 1997 concept album Subterranea
"Capricorn", a song by Barclay James Harvest from the album Eyes of the Universe
"Capricorn", a song by Motörhead from the album Overkill

Other uses in arts, entertainment, and media 
 Capricorn (manga), a 1988 manga series created by Johnny Manajeb
 Capricorn One, a 1978 thriller

Brands and enterprises
Capricorn (microprocessor), a family of microprocessors used in the HP series 80 scientific microcomputers
Capricorn, one of the names for the Virgin Atlantic GlobalFlyer
Capricorn Investment Holdings, an umbrella for the Capricorn group of companies

Other uses
Capricorn, a ship that on January 28, 1980 collided with and sank the USCGC Blackthorn (WLB-391)
Capricorn Africa Society, a pressure group in British African colonies

See also
Caprica (disambiguation), various meanings in the science fiction franchise series Battlestar Galactica
Capricornia (disambiguation)
Tropic of Capricorn (disambiguation)